Gianluca Mancuso (born 3 February 1998) is an Argentine professional footballer who plays as midfielder for UE Cornellà.

Club career
Mancuso made his professional debut for Vélez Sarsfield starting in a 1–0 victory against Olimpo, for the 2016–17 Argentine Primera División. After spending 2018–19 on loan in Italy's Serie B without featuring for Foggia, Mancuso was again loaned out in August 2019 to La Liga side Valladolid; penning for two years.

International career
The midfielder took part of the Argentina national under-15 football team (for the 2013 South American Championship) and the Argentina national under-17 football team (for the 2015 South American Under-17 Football Championship).

Personal life
Gianluca is the son of former Argentine international Alejandro Mancuso.

References

External links
Profile at Vélez Sarsfield's official website 
Profile at BDFA 

1998 births
Living people
Footballers from Buenos Aires
Argentine footballers
Association football midfielders
Argentine Primera División players
Club Atlético Vélez Sarsfield footballers
Calcio Foggia 1920 players
Segunda División B players
Real Valladolid Promesas players
CF La Nucía players
UE Cornellà players
Argentine expatriate footballers
Expatriate footballers in Italy
Expatriate footballers in Spain
Argentine expatriate sportspeople in Italy
Argentine expatriate sportspeople in Spain
Argentina youth international footballers